Lowland heath is a Biodiversity Action Plan habitat as it is a type of ancient wild landscape. Natural England's Environmental Stewardship scheme describes lowland heath as containing dry heath, wet heath and valley mire communities, usually below  in altitude, on acidic soils and shallow peat, typically comprising heathers, gorses, fine grasses, wild flowers and lichens in a complex mosaic. Heathers and other dwarf shrubs usually account for at least 25% of the ground cover. By contrast, upland heath, which is above  in altitude, is called moorland, Dartmoor being an example.

Characteristics
Lowland heath occurs on a range of acidic pH < 5, impoverished soils that are often sandy and free draining, characteristically podsols. There are no deep-burrowing earthworms so soil profile boundaries are sharp. There is often a thick litter layer on top of slow-decaying leaf litter. The habitat is susceptible to drought in summer and due to its freely draining nature. As many of the plants are waxy, fire is a hazard. A plant-animal association has adapted to these harsh conditions.

There are three types of lowland heath according to their location and climate conditions: wet (impervious rocks/clay preventing water drainage), dry (well-drained), and humid (between the two types). Wet heaths contain more different species than dry, such as sphagnum mosses and carnivorous plants (Drosera, Pinguicula).

Development
Some 80% of lowland heath has been lost since 1800, with the UK holding a fifth of the world's remaining stock. Pollen grain carbon dating has indicated that it has existed in the UK for 14,000 years as the ice-caps retreated. As the weather warmed, trees became established and replaced the tundra heath. But 5000 years ago humans began to clear forests, and heathland re-established on acid, sandy soils. Its area is thought to have peaked around the 16th century (Tubbs, 1991). From then onwards agricultural and transport technology improved, allowing nutrients to be put back into the soil, non-heathland type crops to grow, or the heath was simply no longer managed as in the past.

Heathland succession moves from grasses and bracken to gorses and heather, and finally to woodland (birch, pine and oaks).

Heaths are man-made. Heathland was originally wooded with rich soil. As the woods were removed the soils eroded and leached; especially nitrogen easily leaches away.

Indicators
Heathers – (Ling) (Calluna vulgaris) is dominant on moorland; the flowers are pale purple, the plant branches extensively, the leaves are in opposite pairs (not whorls); and are oily in order to prevent water loss. Their mycorrhizal fungus, Hymenoscyphus ericae, is unusual in being able to degrade soil humic materials, giving the plant access to immobilised nutrients (Read 1996, Kerley & Read 1998). Bell heather, Erica cinerea, flowers in mid-July, and is crimson-purple; its leaves are dark green in whorls of three leaves. Cross-leaved heath, Erica tetralix, can be found in wetter patches. It has rose-pink flowers with a nodding, drooping head at the end of the shoot, less dense than bell heather. The leaves are arranged as a cross of four, are greyish with hairs, and are curled downwardthe hairs trap moisture. The plants shut down in summer and grow more in winter. Heathers have a six-year pioneer phase, which is the time they take to form a bush. The bush grows until it is about 25 years old, when the centre starts to have gaps due to less vigorous growth. Mosses/bryophytes start to colonise this area due to the humid conditions. The plant begins to degenerate after 30 years.
Gorse – Ulex europeaus flowers throughout the year but peaks in the spring. Western gorse is smaller and flowers mid-July to mid-August on the more exposed areas. Dwarf gorse is found on the Dorset heaths. Gorses are part of the pea family and have nitrogen-fixing ability due to their symbiotic association with bacteria.
Bracken – Pteridium aquilium is a fern, but is a serious weed due to its deep tough rhizomes. It was formerly cut and used as bedding. Sometimes it was burnt for ash lime.
Grasses – Purple moor grass Molinia caerulea is found in wet locations and is edible when young; fescues Festuca spp and bristle bent are found in dry locations.
No mammals
Many insects.

Typical animal species found in lowland heath are:

Snakes and reptiles. In the UK the smooth snake is only found on heaths in Dorset. The sand lizard is a heath species as well, but is also found on sand dunes.
Birds – Dartford warbler, European stonechat, European nightjar, Eurasian hobby (feeds on insects and birds), tree pipit, and Eurasian wren.

Structure
An ideal heathland includes vegetation of various heights and structures, scattered trees and scrub, some bare ground, wet heaths, ponds, water and bogs.

The cover of dwarf shrubs should be between 25% and 95% with at least two frequent species. There must be a range of age classes of heather present, with cover of young heather between 10 and 15%, and cover of old heather between 10 and 30% cover of undesirable species (bracken, injurious weeds, invasive nonnative plants) must be less than 10%; the cover of trees/scrub must be less than 15%.

Threats 
Threats to heathland include changes in farmland; afforestation; fire; lack of management (overgrowth), for example scrub and bracken encroachment; housing development; quarrying; nutrient enrichment (often dog faeces - Shaw et al. 1995); pine and silver birch, which readily establish and shade the surrounding vegetation; ploughing; and predatory cats (urban heathland sites).

Management 
Options include cutting trees (such as for firewood), using grazing animals to control vegetation and regrowth, controlling scrub, making sure there is an age range, and trying to incorporate the requirement of individual species.

There is a UK Biodiversity Action Plan with a target of restoring  of lowland heathland and recreating a further . In addition, grants are available in England under Natural England's Environmental Stewardship scheme.

UK lowland heath
Lowland Heath can be found in the UK in Devon, Hampshire, Dorset (mainly found here), Sussex (some), Kent (some), Surrey (some), Lincolnshire (some), Cornwall, Norfolk, Nottinghamshire, Merseyside, Cheshire and Suffolk.

East Devon locations are Gittisham Common, Woodbury Common, Mutter's Moor, Aylesbeare Common, Pebblebed Heaths, Trinity Hill, Venn Ottery Common, Bystock Pools, Fire Beacon Hill, Hartridge Common, Offwell Heath, Hense Moor

References 
Kerley, S. J. and Read, D. J. (1998), "The biology of mycorrhiza in the Ericaceae. XX. Plant and mycorrhizal necromass as nitrogenous substrates for the ericoid mycorrhizal fungus Hymenoscyphus ericae and its host". New Phytologist, 139: 353–360. doi: 10.1046/j.1469-
Read, DJ. 1996. "The structure and function of the ericoid mycorrhizal root". Annals of Botany 77: 365–374.
Shaw PJA, Lankey K & Hollingham S.(1995). "Impact of trampling and dog fouling on vegetation and soil conditions on Headley heath". London Naturalist 74, 77–82.
Tubbs, CT (1991). "Grazing the Lowland Heaths". British Wildlife 2 (5), 276–291.

Further reading
 The European Heathland Network
 Tomorrow's Heathland Heritage project
 "Enjoying our Heathland Heritage", Booklet published by Tomorrow's Heathland Heritage.
 Bicton College Environmental Conservation Course
 Lowland Heathland Biodiversity Action Plan (archived copy)
 Offwell Woodland and Wildlife Trust
 Environmental Stewardship (archived copy)

Environment of England